Patrick Sterling Scott is a former wide receiver in the National Football League. He was drafted by the Green Bay Packers in the eleventh round of the 1987 NFL Draft and played two seasons with the team.

References

Green Bay Packers players
American football wide receivers
Grambling State Tigers football players
1964 births
Living people
Players of American football from Shreveport, Louisiana